Abeyta is a surname. Notable people with the surname include:

Aaron Abeyta (born 1965), better known as El Hefe, American musician
Narciso Abeyta (1918–1998), American painter and silversmith
Pablita Abeyta (1953–2017), American sculptor

See also
Abeyta, Colorado, an extinct town in Las Animas County, Colorado, United States
 People with last name Abeita